Cathrannach mac Cathal, possible King of Máenmaige, died 801.

In 801 the Annals of Ulster records the deaths of Cathrannach mac Cathal of Maenmag, and the anchorite Ninnid. Nothing further appears to be known of Cathrannach. His death occurred at a time of conflict between the kingdoms of Aidhne and Uí Maine for control of Maenmaige, with Uí Maine eventually incorporating the kingdom into theirs.

External links
 http://www.ucc.ie/celt/published/T100005A/

References

 Medieval Ireland: Territorial, Political and Economic Divisions, Paul MacCotter, Four Courts Press, 2008, pp. 140–141. 

9th-century Irish monarchs
People from County Galway
801 deaths
Year of birth unknown